A railway pioneer is someone who has made a significant contribution to the historical development of the railway (US: railroad). This definition includes locomotive engineers, railway construction engineers, operators of railway companies, major railway investors and politicians, of national and international importance for the development of rail transport.

Where possible, inclusion in this list should be justified by an appropriate reference (see talk page).

Technical development of the railways

Austria

Germany

Switzerland 
 Roman Abt, Abt rack railway system, points for funicular railways
 Jakob Buchli development of single-axle drive, Buchli drive
 Bruno Hildebrand, founder and CEO of the Swiss Northeastern Railway.
 Emil Huber-Stockar, pioneer of the electric traction with high-tension, low frequency AC
 Eduard Locher, rack with horizontal engagement
 Anatole Mallet, Mallet locomotive
 Niklaus Riggenbach, first mountain railway in Europe with rack system, steam locomotive braking system
 Emil Strub, Strub rack railway system
 René Thury, engineer, "King of DC", experimental rack railway in 1884 at Montreux, responsible for many inventions especially involving series coupling of electric motors

United Kingdom 
 William Adams (1823–1904), locomotive superintendent of NLR, 1858–1873; GER 1873–1878 and L&SWR 1878–1895, inventor of Adams bogie
 William Bridges Adams (1797–1872), author, inventor and locomotive engineer. Inventor of Adams axle
 John Blenkinsop, first locomotives with rack system and rack rails
 Charles Beyer, designer, co-founder and manager of Beyer, Peacock & Co. for many years
 Louis Brennan, inventor of a monorail
 Isambard Kingdom Brunel, railway pioneer, construction of the Great Western Railway
 Oliver Bulleid, unorthodox locomotive designer, CME of Southern Railway, designed the most powerful Pacifics in Britain
 Thomas Russell Crampton, Crampton locomotive
 Robert Francis Fairlie, Fairlie locomotive
 Sir John Fowler, 1st Baronet, London railway, locomotives
 Herbert William Garratt, inventor of the Garratt locomotive
 Sir Nigel Gresley, British steam locomotive manufacturer, world-record holding locomotive, Mallard
 Timothy Hackworth, built Hedley's Puffing Billy and locomotives for the Stockton and Darlington Railway, Participant in the Rainhill trials
 William Hedley, designer of the Puffing Billy
 Charles Lartigue, Lartigue Monorail
 Joseph Locke, next to the Stephensons and Brunel, one of the most important English railway pioneers
 Thomas Newcomen, first practical static steam engine
 Benjamin Outram, civil engineer, surveyor and industrialist. Pioneer in the building of canals and tramways.
 John Ramsbottom, mechanical engineer who invented inter alia the Ramsbottom safety valve, the displacement lubricator, and the water trough
 Sir Vincent Litchfield Raven KBE, was CME of the North Eastern Railway from 1910 to 1922
 George Stephenson, first economically usable steam locomotive
 Robert Stephenson, son of George, winner of the Rainhill trials
 William Stroudley, one of Britain's most famous steam locomotive engineers of the 19th century, working principally for LB&SCR. Designed some of the most famous and longest lived steam locomotives of his era
 Patrick Stirling, CME of the Great Northern Railway where his famous 8 ft singles (4-2-2's) were the principal express engines for many years, achieving world-wide fame
 Richard Trevithick, "father of the locomotive", built first practical steam locomotive at Penydarran in Wales in 1804
 Charles Blacker Vignoles, inventor of the Vignoles rail profile
 James Watt, improvements to the steam engine
 Francis Webb, CME of the London & North Western Railway, a pioneer in the use of steel for locomotives
 William Wilson, first locomotive driver in Germany

United States 
 Horatio Allen, designed world's first articulated locomotive in 1832
 Matthias William Baldwin, Baldwin Locomotive Works, the world's largest steam locomotive manufacturer
 Peter Cooper, first locomotive built in the US
 Charles F. Kettering, developed high-speed, 2-stroke diesel engines especially for rail traction
 William K. MacCurdy, developed the Hydra-Cushion in 1954 to ease stress on freight cars for Southern Pacific
 Sylvester Marsh, first mountain railway in the world with a rack system
 William Norris, founded the Norris Locomotive Works and pioneered the use of the 4-2-0 (Norris type) locomotive in America during the 1840s
 George Mortimer Pullman, Pullman Palace Car Company
 William Robinson, inventor of the track circuit
 Thomas Rogers, mechanical engineer and founder of Rogers Locomotive and Machine Works of Paterson, New Jersey
 Ephraim Shay, inventor of the Shay locomotive
 Frank Julian Sprague, "Father of electric traction" in the US, tramway, train safety system
 Robert L. Stevens, inventor of the Flanged T rail
 George S. Strong, introduced new locomotives types in American much in advance of their time
 Samuel M. Vauclain, Baldwin Locomotive Works, patented the Vauclain compound engine.
 Axel Vogt, mechanical engineer of the Pennsylvania Railroad 1887–1919, responsible for many of the beautifully proportioned and elegantly designed Pennsylvania classes, considerable influence on modern U.S. locomotive design
 George Westinghouse, designed the first through compressed air brake in trains
 Ross Winans, prolific inventor and builder of early American locomotives

Other countries 
 Alfred Belpaire, Belgium, CME and Administrative President of Belgian State Railway. Inventor of Belpaire firebox
 Gaston du Bousquet, France, CME (ingénieur en chef traction) of the Chemin de Fer du Nord
 Dobrivoje Božić, Serbia, mechanical engineer, inventor and constructor of the first air brakes for trains
 Arturo Caprotti, Italy, invented rotating cam valve gear for locomotives, the Caprotti valve gear
 André Chapelon, France, built the most powerful steam locomotives in Europe
 Nicholas Cugnot, France, steam coach
 Alfred de Glehn, France, first compound locomotive with 4 cylinders in 1894
 Attilio Franco and Piero Crosti, Italy, invented the Franco-Crosti boiler
 Abraham Ganz, Austria-Hungary, founder of the Hungarian Ganz & Cie, railway wheels, coach building and electrical railway vehicles
 Jean Jacques Meyer, French locomotive designer, inventor of the articulated Meyer locomotive
 Carl Abraham Pihl, Norway, developer of the CAP Spur alias Kapspur
 Marc Seguin, France, first French locomotive engineer; independent inventor of the fire-tube boiler and blast pipe
 Hideo Shima, Japanese engineer and overseer of the first Shinkansen line.
 Egide Walschaerts, Belgium, engineer and inventor of the Walschaerts valve gear (also called the Heusinger valve gear)

Infrastructure and politics

Austria 
 Carl Ritter von Ghega, Semmering railway
 Baron Albert von Rothschild

Germany 
 Philipp-August von Amsberg, first German state railway
 Herrmann Bachstein, initiated with his Centralverwaltung for Secundairbahnen a large number of branch lines
 Johann Adam Beil, manager of the Taunus railway from 1840 to 1852
 Otto von Bismarck, networking of competing private railways by nationalisation and political pressure, political concept behind the Deutsche Reichsbahn
 Julius Dorpmüller, general manager of the Deutsche Reichsbahn 1926–1945 and Reich Transport Minister from 1937 to 1945, planning of railway construction.
 Paul Camille von Denis, Bavarian Ludwigsbahn from Nuremberg-Fürth
 Karl Etzel, architect and railway pioneer (built, inter alia, the Brennerbahn, the Geislinger Steige and the Bietigheim railway viaduct
 Robert Gerwig, Schwarzwaldbahn, Gotthardbahn
 David Hansemann banker, politician, vice president of the Rhenisch railway company
 Friedrich Harkort, Prinz-Wilhelm railway
 August von der Heydt, head of the Prussian state railways from 1848 to 1869
 Michael Knoll, Geislinger Steige
 Claus Koepcke, engineer and responsible for the development of the Saxon narrow gauge railways as the Geheimer Finanzrat from 1872
 Gustav Kröhnke, engineer, pushed for the construction of the Vogelfluglinie
 Friedrich List, German economist
 Albert von Maybach, head of the Prussian state railways from 1879
 Helmuth Karl Bernhard Graf von Moltke, field marshal, strategist
 Louis Victor Robert Schwartzkopff, German businessman, founded L Schwartzkopff, later Berliner Maschinenbau
 Bethel Henry Strousberg, numerous routes in former Prussia and central Europe

Switzerland 
 Alfred Escher, Swiss railway law, Swiss Northeastern Railway, Gotthardbahn
 Adolf Guyer-Zeller, Jungfraubahn
 Alois Negrelli von Moldelbe, first Swiss railway from Baden to Zürich
 , initiator of the Rhaetian Railway

United Kingdom 
 Thomas Brassey, railway entrepreneur, built railways on every continent
 Isambard Kingdom Brunel, numerous British railway lines, broad gauge
 Edward Pease, initiator and operator of the Stockton and Darlington Railway, co-founder of the railway town of Middlesbrough
 Sir Samuel Morton Peto, English railway entrepreneur (1809–1889)

United States 
 John W. Barriger III, railway entrepreneur
 Henry Morrison Flagler, Florida East Coast Railway
 Jay Gould, railway tycoon
 E. H. Harriman, railway tycoon
 James J. Hill, railway tycoon
 David Moffat, railway entrepreneur
 William Jackson Palmer, railway entrepreneur
 van Sweringen brothers, railway entrepreneurs
 Cornelius Vanderbilt, railway tycoon, patented Vanderbilt boilers and tenders
 Daniel Willard, railway manager

Other countries 
 Louis Armand, France, president of SNCF board of directors, president of UIC and inventor of water treatment process for steam locomotives
 Cecil Rhodes, railway construction in Africa
 William Cornelius Van Horne, responsible for the completion of the transcontinental route of the Canadian Pacific Railway
 Søren Hjorth, initiator of the first Scandinavian railway line from Copenhagen to Roskilde

See also 
History of rail transport

References 

 
 
 
Pioneers